Krik? Krak! is a collection of short stories written by Edwidge Danticat and published in 1996. It consists of nine short stories plus an epilogue. The stories are tied together by similar plots of struggle and survival within the Haitian community. The title of the books is a reference to the Haitian cultural tradition of folk storytelling.

Plot overview
Krik? Krak! contains nine stories as well as an epilogue. The stories take place in Port-au-prince, Haiti, Ville Rose, and New York. The stories are about women trying to understand their relationships to their families as well as Haiti. The Epilogue, "Women like Us", suggests that these women have a relationship with one another. The epilogue's unnamed narrator recognizes the similarity between herself and her mother as well as her female ancestors. These women all cook when they feel the need to express their sorrows and pain, but the narrator chooses to write despite her mother's disapproval. Her mother feels that she could be killed because that is often the case with Haitian writers. The narrator keeps her female ancestor's history alive through her stories.

Themes

In the short story collection Krik? Krak!, there are several different themes played out. One of the major themes in this story is the diversity of suffering. At one point and in one way or another, someone has experienced suffering in his or her own way. The characters in this collection of short stories have each come from a different background and experienced different things. However, they share the same pains and sufferings to a certain degree.  The protagonists of each story struggle against the economic and political diversity along with their own personal obstacles of despair and self-doubt.  
In "Children of the Sea",  when the main character Celianne throws herself into the sea, the despair that she felt is felt by the narrator of that same story when he embraces death. The despair is also felt by the mother in "Caroline's Wedding" when she attends a mass for refugees, who like Celianne in "Children of the Sea" died at sea. However, when these different characters are witnessing the terrible things occurring to people they love as well as the country they love, they react differently. The character Guy in "A Wall of Fire Rising," tries to defy hopelessness by stealing a brief moment of glory despite the fact that he knows it will end in death. The mother in "New York Day Women" begins a new life in the U.S., but she still can’t face the suffering she left behind. Although the people all experience the same types of hardships, they still remain individuals.

References 

SparkNotes Editors. "SparkNotes on Krik? Krak!." SparkNotes.com. SparkNotes LLC.2006.Web. 1 Apr. 2010.

Danticat, Edwidge. Krik? Krak! New York : Vintage Books, 1996. 1st Vintage contemporaries ed.

1995 short story collections
Haitian books
American short story collections
Postcolonial literature